Michael Wayne Dunahee (May 12, 1986 – disappeared March 24, 1991) is a Canadian missing child who disappeared from the playground at Blanshard Park Elementary School in Victoria, British Columbia on March 24, 1991 and has never been found or seen since. Michael was last seen that day around 12:30pm at the playground as his mother Crystal Dunahee was participating in a women's football practice where his father was a spectator. Although he disappeared metres from his parents, no witnesses to his disappearance have ever been identified.

Michael's disappearance became one of the largest police investigations in Canadian history, and to this day, over 11,000 tips have been received by the police. The case was a major story for many years, and was reported across Canada and the United States. However, despite a large number of tips and a  reward, the police still do not have any solid leads in the case.

Disappearance 
On March 24, 1991, Michael and his family went to Blanshard Elementary School for his mother Crystal's flag football practice. Michael was wearing a blue hooded jacket, a Teenage Mutant Ninja Turtles T-shirt, rugby pants, and blue sneakers that day. The family arrived at the school around 12:30pm, and when they got there, Michael asked his mom if he could go to the playground, which was near the field where the football practice was taking place. Despite having a gut feeling that "something wasn't quite right", Crystal allowed him to walk to the playground by himself, but told him that once he got there, he had to "stay there and wait for Daddy to come". However, when Michael's dad Bruce came to the playground, Michael was not there. Around fifty people began to look for Michael, and his parents immediately notified the police.

Investigation

Initial search efforts 
At that time, the investigation regarding Michael's disappearance became one of the largest in Canadian history, and still remains one of the largest today. Since Michael disappeared so quickly from a public place, the police quickly classified his case as an abduction rather than a missing child case, and all the detectives from the Victoria Police Department were called in to solve the case. Hundreds of tips began coming in every hour from across British Columbia and North America, and during that time had to be written on carbon paper and sorted out manually. The police believe that if they had current technology, such as video surveillance, DNA techniques, and a computer system to sort out tips, the case might have been solved.

Victoria detectives investigated known sex offenders and interviewed anyone who had been in the area around the time of Michael's disappearance, but were unable to find much information except a witness report that "a man in his late 40s or early 50s" with a brown van was near the playground. A month after Michael disappeared, the police staged a re-enactment of his disappearance at Blanshard Elementary using a brown van, but were unable to produce any new leads.

Reported sightings 
In 2006, reports of a young man who physically resembled Michael and was living in the Interior of British Columbia since 1990 breathed new life into the case. However, the man was confirmed by DNA testing not to be Michael.

In early 2009, police in Milwaukee, Wisconsin found a missing person poster of Michael at the home of Vernon Seitz, 62, who confessed to his psychiatrist that he murdered a child in 1959 when he was 12 and knew of another child killing. Seitz was later found dead by Milwaukee police, apparently from natural causes.

In 2011, with the 20th anniversary of Michael's disappearance approaching, the police were notified of a man living in Chase, British Columbia who looked like Michael, but DNA testing later confirmed that he was not Michael.

In 2013, a man with the username Canuckels posted on the message boards of the Vancouver Canucks' official website claiming that the police were coming for a DNA test. They requested a blood sample from a man in Surrey, British Columbia who they believed could possibly be Michael. However, on September 9, the Victoria Police Department stated that the Surrey man was not Michael after DNA testing was done.

In 2020, a Tiktoker by the name of "Shangerdanger" reportedly found the shirt Michael was said to be wearing at the time of his disappearance. The rare Teenage Mutant Ninja Turtle shirt was found submerged underwater, but after Michael's family reached out to the Tiktoker, they saw the shirt and realized it was not the exact same shirt he was wearing during his disappearance.

Later developments 
As of 2021 Michael's case remains open, with both the police and Michael's family remaining hopeful for an ultimate resolution. In 2021 the Victoria Police Department released an age-enhanced sketch of Michael and launched an online tip portal, with police constable Cam MacIntyre stating that over 10,000 tips have been received since 1991.

Impact 
Many Victoria residents recalled the day of Michael's disappearance as a "loss of innocence" for the city, as the fact that a child had been abducted in their community came as a shock. Fears and concerns about child abduction quickly began to rise among parents, kids, and schools in the months after the disappearance. Crystal became an advocate for missing children's issues in British Columbia, and has served as the president of Child Find British Columbia. In 2002, she lent her voice to support the Royal Canadian Mounted Police (RCMP) in calls to introduce an Amber Alert system in the province, as she believed that her son would have been found if such a program had existed in 1991. The system has since been implemented in most regions of Canada. The community of Esquimalt, part of the Greater Victoria metropolitan area, holds an annual charity event called the Michael Dunahee "Keep the Hope Alive" Fund Run to raise money for Child Find. This event is organized by Michael's sister Caitlin.

See also
List of people who disappeared

References

External links
MissingKids.ca profile of Michael Dunahee
Child Find Canada profile of Michael Dunahee

Canada - Michael Dunahee, 4, Victoria, BC, 24 March 1991 Websleuths
Island Crime (podcast), Season 3: ‘Missing Michael’

1990s missing person cases
1991 in British Columbia
1991 crimes in Canada
20th century in Victoria, British Columbia
Crime in British Columbia
History of Victoria, British Columbia
Missing Canadian children
Missing person cases in Canada